Tsoukalaiika is a village and a community in the municipal unit of Vrachnaiika in the northern part of Achaea, Greece. It is on the southwestern edge of the metropolitan area of Patras, on the Gulf of Patras, 13 km southwest of Patras city centre. It is located on the Greek National Road 9 (Patras - Pyrgos - Pylos) and the railway from Patras to Pyrgos.

Historical population

See also
List of settlements in Achaea

References

Populated places in Achaea
Vrachnaiika